Cássia Rock Eller is an album of covers and original songs, recorded by Brazilian singer Cássia Eller in 2000.

Track listing

 "Smells Like Teen Spirit" (Nirvana)
 "Vida Bandida" (Lobão)
 "Pro Dia Nascer Feliz" (Barão Vermelho)
 "Hear My Train A Comin'" (Jimi Hendrix)
 "Geração Coca-Cola" (Legião Urbana)
 "Não sei o que Eu Quero da Vida" (Hermelino Néder and Arrigo Barnabé)
 "Bete Balanço" (Barão Vermelho)
 "Woman is the Nigger of the World" (John Lennon and Yoko Ono)
 "Um Branco, um Xis, um Zero" (Marisa Monte, Arnaldo Antunes and Pepeu Gomes)
 "Faça o que Quiser Fazer" (Felipe Cambraia, Lúcio Krops and Fábio Allman)
 "Brasil" (Cazuza)
 "If Six Was Nine" (Jimi Hendrix)
 "Malandragem" (Cazuza)
 "Rainha da Noite / (I Can't Get No) Satisfaction" (Edson Cordeiro and The Rolling Stones)

References

Cássia Eller albums
2000 albums
Covers albums